Soulcrusher and variants may refer to:

 Soul-Crusher, a 1987 album by White Zombie
 Soulcrusher (Operator album), 2007
 "Soul-Crusher" (song), a 1992 song by White Zombie on the album La Sexorcisto: Devil Music Volume One
 "Soulcrusher" (song), a 2007 song by Operator from the album of the same name
 Soulcrusher (video game), 2012; see List of first-person shooters
 Soul Crusher, a fictional magical sword; see List of Record of Lodoss War characters

See also
 The Soul Crush EP, by The Fratellis (2013)